was a Japanese woodblock print artist prominent in the sōsaku hanga movement in twentieth century Japan.

Style and technique
Ono's early prints (prior to World War II), were deeply rooted in the social-critical movement of German expressionism and the art trend dominating in Russia and among critical, intellectual circles in China Lu Xun.

Later prints saw a lessened proletarian engagement, but the artist's interest in cityscapes, and the newly industrialised face of Japan remained constant throughout his career.

References
 The Ono Tadashige Museum (小野忠重版画館). Ono Tadashige Zenhanga (小野忠重全版画) /  Japan: Kyūryūdō, 2005. . 
 Merritt, Helen and Nanako Yamada.  (1995). Guide to Modern Japanese Woodblock Prints, 1900-1975.'' Honolulu: University of Hawaii Press.	; ;  OCLC 247995392

External links
   Ono Tadashige Museum in Asagaya, Tokyo
  Biography on Artelino.com
Works

Japanese printmakers
Artists from Tokyo
1909 births
1990 deaths
Sosaku hanga artists